Albert Iten (born 27 May 1962) is a Swiss former professional cross-country and downhill mountain biker. He won the UCI Downhill World Championships in 1991. He also won the cross-country event at the 1994 European Mountain Bike Championships.

References

External links

Living people
Downhill mountain bikers
1962 births
Swiss male cyclists
Swiss mountain bikers
Cyclists from Zürich